FTSE China A50 Index (was known as FTSE–Xinhua China A50 Index) is a stock market index by FTSE Group (FTSE–Xinhua joint venture until 2010), the components were chosen from Shanghai Stock Exchange and Shenzhen Stock Exchange, which issue A-share; B-share (share for foreigners) were not included .

Other similar product were CSI 300 Index (and the sub-index CSI 100) by China Securities Index Company and "Dow Jones China 88 Index" by S&P Dow Jones Indices. For top 50 companies in the Shanghai Stock Exchange, see SSE 50 Index, For top 100 companies in the Shenzhen Stock Exchange, see SZSE 100 Index.

Constituents

Other indices
 FTSE China B Share All Cap Index all B shares in Shenzhen and Shanghai Stock Exchange (currently 57 companies)
 Hang Seng China Enterprises Index top 50 H shares in Hong Kong Stock Exchange
 Hang Seng China-Affiliated Corporations Index top 25 Red Chips in Hong Kong Stock Exchange
 FTSE China 50 Index, top 50 H shares, P Chip and Red Chip in Hong Kong Stock Exchange
 FTSE China A-H 50 Index top 50 A+H shares in Hong Kong, Shanghai and Shenzhen Stock Exchange
 Hang Seng China 50 Index top 50 A+H+Red Chip+other in Hong Kong, Shanghai and Shenzhen Stock Exchange
 For products by MSCI, see this link.

FTSE China A50 Index tracker funds

Exchange-traded funds
 CSOP A50 ETF in HK$
 CSOP A50 ETF-R in 

 iShares FTSE A50 China Index ETF synthetic ETF
 Bosera FTSE China A50 Index ETF in HK$
 Bosera FTSE China A50 Index ETF-R in 
PRINCIPAL FTSE CHINA 50 ETF (KLSE: 0823EA) in MYR

References

External links
 

Shanghai Stock Exchange
Shenzhen Stock Exchange
FTSE China A50 Index
FTSE Group stock market indices
Chinese stock market indices